Stuart Ross Gillespie (born 2 March 1957) is a former New Zealand cricketer who played one Test match and 19 One Day Internationals for the New Zealand national cricket team.

International career
He played as a specialist seam bowler, although he did make 28 in his only Test innings as nightwatchman. His Test selection came after taking 13 wickets in the 1985–86 One Day International World Series Cup, although he had only played two first class games in the preceding two seasons. Gillespie took one wicket for 79, which was not enough to keep his place, and after three wickets at a bowling average just above 60 in the 1985–86 home series against Australia he was dropped.

He missed the 1987 World Cup, but returned for the World Series Cup following the tournament, where he played all eight group stage matches and took seven wickets – before he was replaced by Richard Hadlee for the final series.

He never returned to international cricket, and retired the following season.

See also
 One-Test wonder

1957 births
Auckland cricketers
Living people
New Zealand cricketers
New Zealand Test cricketers
New Zealand One Day International cricketers
Northern Districts cricketers
Northumberland cricketers